The 1991–92 season was the 77th season of the Isthmian League, which is an English football competition featuring semi-professional and amateur clubs from London, East and South East England.

For the first time league consisted of four divisions after at the end of the previous season Division Two North and the Division Two South were merged into single Division Two and also Division Three was formed.

Premier Division

The Premier Division consisted of 22 clubs, including 19 clubs from the previous season and three new clubs:
 Bromley, promoted as runners-up in Division One
 Chesham United, promoted as champions of Division One
 Sutton United, relegated from Football Conference

At the end of the season Dagenham merged into Conference side Redbridge Forest to form new club Dagenham & Redbridge. Thus, Bognor Regis Town was reprieved from relegation.

League table

Division One

Division One consisted of 22 clubs, including 16 clubs from the previous season and six new clubs:

Two clubs relegated from the Premier Division:
 Barking
 Leyton-Wingate

Two clubs promoted from Division Two North:
 Stevenage Borough
 Vauxhall Motors

Two clubs promoted from Division Two South:
 Abingdon Town
 Maidenhead United

At the end of the season Harlow Town left the league due to problems with their ground and missed the next season not joining any other league.

League table

Division Two

Division Two consisted of 22 clubs, including 18 clubs from the previous season's Division Two North and Division Two South and four clubs relegated from Division One:

Clubs relegated from Division One:
 Lewes
 Metropolitan Police
 Southwick
 Worthing

Clubs transferred from Division Two North:
 Barton Rovers
 Berkhamsted Town
 Billericay Town
 Hemel Hempstead
 Purfleet
 Saffron Walden Town
 Rainham Town
 Ware
 Witham Town

Clubs transferred from Division Two South:
 Banstead Athletic
 Egham Town
 Harefield United
 Hungerford Town
 Leatherhead
 Malden Vale
 Newbury Town
 Ruislip Manor
 Southall

League table

Division Three

At the end of the previous season Division Two North and Division Two South were merged resulting in creation of Division Three.

Division Three consisted of 21 clubs, including 20 clubs from the previous season's Division Two North and Division Two South and one new club:

Club joined from the South Midlands League:
 Thame United

Clubs relegated from Division Two North:
 Clapton
 Collier Row
 Edgware Town
 Hertford Town
 Hornchurch
 Kingsbury Town
 Royston Town
 Tilbury
 Tring Town

Clubs relegated from Division Two South:
 Bracknell Town
 Camberley Town
 Chertsey Town
 Cove
 Eastbourne United
 Epsom & Ewell
 Feltham
 Flackwell Heath
 Hampton
 Horsham
 Petersfield United

Before the season started Feltham merged with the Hellenic League side Hounslow to create Feltham & Hounslow Borough F.C.

League table

See also
Isthmian League
1991–92 Northern Premier League
1991–92 Southern Football League

References

Isthmian League seasons
6